Visa requirements for Cape Verdean citizens are administrative entry restrictions by the authorities of other states placed on citizens of Cape Verde. As of 19 July 2022, Cape Verdean citizens had visa-free or visa on arrival access to 67 countries and territories, ranking the Cape Verdean passport 80th in terms of travel freedom (tied with passports from the Philippines and Uganda) according to the Henley Passport Index.

Visa requirements map

Visa requirements

Dependent, disputed, or restricted territories

Unrecognized or partially recognized countries

Dependent and autonomous territories

Non-visa restrictions

See also

Visa policy of Cape Verde
Cape Verdean passport

External links
 VisaHQ - Cape Verdean Passport

References and Notes
References

Notes

Cape Verde
Foreign relations of Cape Verde